Pericallis lanata is a species of flowering plant in the family Asteraceae. It is endemic to the Canary Islands.

References

lanata
Flora of the Canary Islands